Jacques de Livron Joachim de la Tour de la Casa Martinez de Pasqually (1727?–1774) was a theurgist and theosopher of uncertain origin. He was the founder of the l'Ordre de Chevaliers Maçons Élus Coëns de l'Univers - Commonly referred to as the 'Elus Cohens' in 1761. He was the tutor, initiator and friend of Louis-Claude de Saint-Martin and Jean-Baptiste Willermoz.

Biography

Martinez de Pasqually, whose biography is continually being researched, due to the lack of documentation, appears in the history of French freemasonry in 1754.

His exact date and place of birth, as well as his true nationality is unknown. A number of authors proposed that he was a Spanish Jew but later researches counter that this was unlikely.

Certain similarities between Pasqually's theurgy and Portuguese hermetic thought led philosopher Sampaio Bruno (1857-1915) to argue that he was probably of Portuguese origin. In 1772 Pasqually went to collect an inheritance in the island of Hispaniola. Grainville, one of his fervent disciples, came from the Caribbean. In any case, at the time he went to Saint Domingue, the French colony which was soon to become Haiti, he was traveling back and forth to a French colony and Spanish colony, not a Portuguese holding. He died within two years and appears to have influenced early mystic groups in the Caribbean. Others again claim he was born in Grenoble. In reality, we know nothing with certainty of his origin. His activities before 1760 are also poorly understood.  This is largely due to the fact that he used several different names and signatures on official documents during his lifetime.

Elus Cohens

For twenty years, spanning from 1754 to 1774, the year of his death, Pasqually worked ceaselessly to establish and promote his .

In 1754 he founded the Chapter of Scottish Judges in Montpellier.

In 1761, he became affiliated with the lodge La Française in Bordeaux and founded a Cohen Temple there.

In 1764  La Française was reorganized by him as Française Élue Écossaise to indicate that it now had a Chapter of superior degrees.

In 1766 the directors of the Masonic province of Bordeaux declared that they were abolishing all constitutions relating to higher grades apart from the first three (Regular Blue- or St. John's degrees of: Apprentice, Fellowcraft and Master). As a result, all the works of the Chapter were suspended. 
This same year Martinez travelled to Paris and found a new and explicit Elus Cohen-temple together with Bacon de Chivalerie, Jean-Baptiste Willermoz, Fauger d'Ignéacourt, the Count of Lusignan, Henri de Loos, Grainville, and several others that were to play important parts in the history the Order.

In 1767, he established the Sovereign Tribunal who would direct the whole Order of the Elus Coens.

In 1768 he met with Louis-Claude de Saint-Martin. The personality and teachings of Pasqually made a deep and lasting impression on Saint-Martin. Conversely, Pasqually himself was influenced by Saint-Martin who decided to leave his military career in 1771 and become the personal secretary of Martinez, replacing Abbe Pierre Fournié. 
From this period  the notable development of the rituals of the order starts and Pasquallys drafting of his magnum opus, the Treatise on the Reintegration of Beings, the main doctrinal foundation of the Martinist theosophy and theurgy.

In 1772 Martiez, embarked on a trip to Santo Domingo to receive an inheritance, and subsequently died there in 1774. Thereafter, the Order disintegrates.

In 1776, the Coens Temples of La Rochelle, Marseilles, and Libourne fall into the grasp of the Grand Lodge of France.

In 1777, the rites are no longer in operation and institutional use, except from some circles in Paris, Versailles and Eu.

Finally, in 1781, Sebastien Las Casas, third and last 'Grand Sovereign' of the Elus Cohens (successor of Caignet de Lester, who died in 1778) ordered the closure of the eight remaining temples that still recognize his authority. 
Neither Las Casas nor Caignet played a very important role in the orders development.

Despite the official closure, the Elus Coens continued to both practice theurgy, and to conduct initiations. On the other hand, the theosophical teaching of Martinez was not lost, in masonry, it spreads even long after the death of the leader through the Masonic system established by Willermoz shortly after death his master.

Besides Willermoz and Saint-Martin, the last known personal disciple of Martinez was Abbe Pierre Fournié. It was around 1768 that he met the teacher who would make him turn around his life completely, and of whom would be employed as secretary. Initiated as an Elus Coën, the tonsured cleric Fournié resides mainly in Bordeaux, where he mediates the correspondences between different members of the Order.

In 1776, Louis-Claude de Saint-Martin is quoted as describing him as an Elus Cohen exceptionally favoured in supernatural manifestations; the source is Fournié himself  in his own work What we've been, what we are and what we become  (1802), in fear of saying too much. 
At the time of the revolution Fournié emigrated to England, where he remained until his death, and in this period, from 1818 to 1821, he befriends the Theosophist of Munich Franz von Baader.

The structure of the Elus Cohens

This doctrine, he intended for an elite chosen from the ranks of his contemporary masons, and gathered under the banner of the 'Elus Coens' (Elect Priests).
Quickly this order gained quite the reputation in French masonic circles, but the theurgic operations remained reserved for the higher degrees. 
Martinez did not, to a greater extent, graft his system solely on freemasonry. 
Until 1761, it is to be located in Montpellier, Paris, Lyons, Bordeaux, Marseilles, and Avignon.

In 1761 he built a special temple in Avignon, where he resided himself until 1766. 
At that time, the Order of the Elect Coens is worked as a high-degree system superimposed on the Blue Lodges: 
The first class has three symbolic degrees, and that of 'maître parfait élu', then the grades Coens proper: apprentice Coën, fellowcraft Coën, and master Coën, Grand Master Coën or Grand Architect, Chevalier d'Orient or Knight Zorobabel, Commandeur d'Orient or Commander Zorobabel, and finally the last degree, the supreme consecration of Reaux Croix.

In 1768, Jean-Baptiste Willermoz is ordained Reau-Croix by Bacon Chivalerie. Louis-Claude de Saint-Martin commenced the system in 1765, rising quickly to Commander of the Orient. The years 1769 and 1770 saw the Coen-groups multiply extensively in France. 
In 1772, Saint-Martin was ordained Reau-Croix.

Recent discoveries on Pasqually's ancestry
According to the researches of George C. and the elements discovered by Michele Friot and Nahon, namely a certificate of Catholicism (published in Bulletin de la Société Martines de Pasqually, Bordeaux) and the letters from Martinez regarding the Guers affair, neither Martinez nor his father could be Jewish. The third reason is that at the time, Jews were not accepted as Freemasons in France. These facts disprove the hypothesis proposed by the late Martinist-scholar Robert Amadou who proposed that Martinez was a Spanish Jew (Louis-Claude de Saint-Martin et le Martinisme,  Paris, Éditions Le Griffon d'or, 1946).

The theory of Martinez being Portuguese is also contested: The fact that Martinez traveled to Santo Domingo to receive an inheritance, does not support the theory of Portugal as his ethnic background. The island of St. Domingo (Hispaniola) was never under Portuguese rule, seeing that the French settlers, the 'Frères de la Côte Français' seized control over areas gradually abandoned by the Spaniards.

In a word, the western part was under French sovereignty and that of the Spaniards was located to the east. (Henri Bernard Catus 27 May 2009). The place of residence for Martinez, namely Leogane and Port-au-Prince, was French and occupied by the regiment of Foix, the same military operation from which Saint-Martin himself was recruited.

The wife of Martinez is believed to come from the very rich French settlers of the island; Collas de Mauvignié originally from Gornac near Bordeaux. Martines married Collas Angelique Marguerite, daughter of Anselm Collas on 27 August 1767 at Gornac.

However, if Martinez spoke French very well, he wrote very badly. His son, according to a police report, spoke Spanish very well. The hypothesis of a Spanish origin should therefore be retained. Research done in Grenoble by G.C. on all civil records on marriage certificates shows that Martinez is not registered in Grenoble. But it is possible that children born in the military forces at the time were not recorded in parish registers. Grenoble keeps track of a document stating that Captain Pasqually was stationed there, but it may be a namesake at the recovery of bodies of troops from Spain and used in the French army.

De Grainville was one of the most loyal of secretaries of Martinez, and also attained the degree of Reaux-Croix. He was born on 21 June 1728 on the island of Bourbon (now Reunion Island), a native of Normandy (historical archives of the Army Château de Vincennes Paris). He ended his military career in 1780 with the rank of lieutenant colonel.

Doctrine
The doctrine of Martinez is described as a key to any eschatological cosmology. God, the primordial Unity, had a desire to emanate beings from his own nature, but Lucifer, who wanted to exercise his own creative power, fell victim to his own faults. In his fall, which included his followers, he found himself trapped within an area designated by God to serve as their prison. God sent man, in an androgynous body and endowed with glorious powers, to keep Lucifer's rebels at bay and work towards their reconciliation.  Adam prevaricated himself and fell into the very prison he was to contain, becoming a physical and mortal being, and was so thus forced to try to save both himself and the original creation. It can be done via inner perfection with the help of Christ, but also by the theurgic operations that Martinez taught to the men of desire he found worthy of receiving his initiation.

This is obtained by practicing certain rites, where the disciple is to enter into relations with angelic entities that appear in the operations as passes. These are to appear mostly in the form of characters or hieroglyphs of spirits invoked by the operator, as proofs that he is on the proper way of Reintegration.

Legacy

After World War 2 Robert Ambelain created a new "Martinist Order of the Élus Cohen" as a revival of the Order of Pasqually. This was officially closed, as publicly announced in the Martinist magazine L'Initiation, in 1964.

However, several strains of martinist-orders have continued to operate the Elus Cohens in succession of the Ambelain resurgence.

Today the Elus Cohens is mainly worked in two different manners, one in the fashion of Robert Ambelain, heavily influenced by his own Gnostic Church, the rite of Memphis-Misraim and his personal take on the kabbalah.

There also exists another manner of operation, where Pasqually's original system is practiced more in tune with the intents of the system as it were in the 1770s, where neo-gnostic tendencies and kabbalah is removed, in favor of the original doctrines. Ordre Reaux Croix is working the Elus Cohens in a similar manner, and also including women, as Pasqually himself did on two occasions.

There are currently three Orders that are trying to philologically rebuild what the original Coëns did; they are in Spain, France and Italy. These are  reserved circles that do not actively advertise their activities.

References

Sources
This biography is a partial reproduction of la-rose-bleue.org

Bibliography

Books
 Martines of Pasqually, Treatise on the reintegration of beings  (from the manuscript of Louis-Claude de Saint-Martin), Diffusion Rosicrucienne, Collection Martin.

Studies on Martines Pasqually
 Franz von Baader,  Les Enseignements secrets de Martinès de Pasqually, précédé d'une Notice sur le martinézisme et le martinisme, Bibliothèque Chacornac, 1900 ; rééd. Robert Dumas, 1976 ; Editions Télétès, 2004.
 Gilles Pope, Les écritures magiques, Aux sources du Registre des 2400 noms d'anges et d'archanges de Martinès de Pasqually,  Arché Edidit, 2006.
 G. Van Rijnberk, Un thaumaturge au XVIII (2) s. : Martines de Pasqually Sa vie, son oeuvre, son ordre  I, Paris, Alcan, 1935; t. II, Lyon, Derain-Raclet, 1938
 Jean-Marc Vivenza, Martinez, Le Martinisme, l'enseignement secret des Maîtres, Martinès de Pasqually, Louis-Claude de Saint-Martin et Jean-Baptiste Willermoz, fondateur du Régime Écossais Rectifié,  Le Mercure Dauphinois, 2006.

Works on the Elus Cohens
 Robert Amadou, "Rituels d'initiation des élus coën".

External links

 Biography of Pasqually Martines, Jean-François Var.

Martinism
1720s births
1774 deaths
French Freemasons